"A Disney Halloween" is a 60-minute Halloween-themed episode which originally aired as part of television series Walt Disney on CBS, October 24, 1981. The special is hosted by the Magic Mirror (voiced by an uncredited actor) which incorporates segments of various villains from three Disney feature films and two classic short cartoons.

Featured segments with the Magic Mirror 
 The Headless Horseman - The Adventures of Ichabod and Mr. Toad (1949)
 The Evil Queen – Snow White and the Seven Dwarfs (1937)
 Trick or Treat (1952)
 Maleficent – Sleeping Beauty (1959)
 Lonesome Ghosts (1937)

See also
 "Our Unsung Villains" (1956)
 "Halloween Hall o' Fame" (1977)
 "Disney's Greatest Villains" (1977)
 "Disney's Greatest Villains" (1984)
 "Disney's Halloween Treat" (1982)
 "A Disney Halloween" (1983)
 "Scary Tales" (1986, varies)
Mickey's House of Villains (2002)
Once Upon a Halloween (2005)

References

External links
 

1981 American television episodes
1980s American television specials
Halloween television specials
Walt Disney anthology television series episodes